Junkhouse was a Canadian rock band, formed during 1989 in Hamilton, Ontario. They released three albums during the 1990s, which spawned numerous charting singles in Canada. They initially disbanded in 1998, and reformed for various one-off shows afterwards.

History

Formed in 1989 in Hamilton, Ontario, the band consisted of vocalist and guitarist Tom Wilson, guitarist Dan Achen, bassist Russ Wilson, and drummer Ray Farrugia (despite their shared surname, Tom and Russ Wilson are not related).

The band got its first widespread exposure opening for Crash Vegas on that band's tour to support their debut album, Red Earth. Crash Vegas member Colin Cripps was one of Junkhouse's early mentors and supporters. In 1993, the band signed to Sony Records, and released a Sony Music publishing demo Here Lies Happiness, which was a collection of their early recordings. The band was then moved to Sony's Epic Records division. In September 1993 they released their official debut, Strays, and promoted the album by touring as an opening act for The Waltons and Soul Asylum. That album was produced by Malcolm Burn, and produced radio hits for the band with "Out of My Head", "Praying for the Rain", and "Big Brown Turtle" all charting on RPM's Top Singles chart. The band was also featured on the soundtrack to the television show Due South.  Their cover of the song "Oh, What a Feeling" is on the first of the two soundtracks from the Paul Haggis show.

In 1995, they released their second album Birthday Boy, which included a duet with Sarah McLachlan on the song "Burned Out Car". The lead single "Be Someone" had peaked at #17 on RPM's Top Singles chart, their highest position on the chart. Bassist Russ Wilson left the band in 1996, and was replaced by Grant Marshall. In 1997, Colin Cripps joined the band after the dissolution of Crash Vegas. He played as the second guitarist and also keyboardist.

Junkhouse released their final album, Fuzz, which was primarily written by Wilson and Cripps. Although the band stayed with Sony, they were moved from Epic Records onto Columbia Records for the album. Both singles off of the album, "Pearly White" and "Shine", had reached the top 10 of RPM's Alternative 30 chart. Following Fuzz, the band members went their separate ways. A compilation, Rounders: The Best of Junkhouse, was released in 2002 by Sony. Although no longer recording, the band performed together occasionally. They played on a bill with Finger Eleven at a tsunami benefit in Hamilton on February 2, 2005. and reunited on November 7, 2009 to celebrate its 20th anniversary with a concert at Toronto's Horseshoe Tavern.

Tom Wilson released two solo albums, Planet Love in 2001 and Dog Years in 2006. He has collaborated with Stephen Fearing and Colin Linden in the supergroup Blackie and the Rodeo Kings, in which Russ Wilson also guested on their 2006 album Let's Frolic. Tom Wilson, along with Ray Farrugia, had also formed the band Lee Harvey Osmond in 2009. Colin Cripps became involved in numerous bands such as C and C Surf Factory and Blue Rodeo. 

Dan Achen owned Catherine North Studio in Hamilton. Several internationally known artists have recorded at Catherine North over the past 10 years, including Achen's niece Feist. At a 2008 concert at Hamilton Place, the Grammy-nominated singer held up her favorite red guitar and proudly announced that it was a gift from "Uncle Dan". In 2008, Achen co-produced the Juno-winning album Bring Me Your Love, a solo project by Dallas Green of the platinum-selling rock band Alexisonfire.

Dan Achen died on March 15, 2010, of a heart attack while playing hockey. His funeral was attended by friends and family, including his former bandmates in Junkhouse. On March 20, 2010, Ron McLean profiled Dan Achen and Junkhouse with a segment prior to the Leafs-Canadiens game on Hockey Night in Canada.

Members
Tom Wilson – vocals, guitars (1989–1998)
Dan Achen – guitars (1989–1998)
Ray Farrugia – drums (1989–1998)
Russ Wilson – bass (1989–1996)
Grant Marshall – bass (1996–1998)
Colin Cripps – guitars, keyboards (1997–1998)

Discography

Albums
1993 Strays
1995 Birthday Boy
1997 Fuzz

Singles

Other releases
1991 Here Lies Happiness (self-released demo album)
2002 Rounders: The Best of Junkhouse (greatest hits compilation)

References

External links
Junkhouse at CanadianBands.com
Junkhouse at BillBoard.com
[ Junkhouse] at allmusic

Musical groups established in 1989
Musical groups disestablished in 1998
Musical groups from Hamilton, Ontario
Canadian alternative rock groups
1989 establishments in Ontario
1998 disestablishments in Ontario